Stefano Rossini (born 3 January 1991) is an Italian footballer.

Biography
Born in Formia, Lazio region, Rossini started his career at the regional and national capital – Rome, for Cisco Roma. He spent 1 season in Serie D before joining Serie C2 team Fondi.

On 4 July 2013 he was signed by Serie A club Parma on free transfer. On 9 July 2013 he was farmed to Vigor Lamezia. On 8 July 2014 the loan was renewed.

In August 2015, Rossini joined Italian club ASD Nuova Itri Calcio. He announced in June 2019, that he would leave the club after four years.

References

External links
 AIC profile (data by football.it) 

Italian footballers
Atletico Roma F.C. players
S.S. Racing Club Fondi players
Vigor Lamezia players
Serie C players
Association football midfielders
Sportspeople from the Province of Latina
Footballers from Lazio
1991 births
Living people